Nanchang District (Wu: Nu Zang Qu) is one of six urban districts of Wuxi, Jiangsu province, China.

Southeast of the city centre, the district includes more ancient infrastructure and historically important sites. The area is also densely industrial.

References

County-level divisions of Jiangsu
Wuxi